Iriston's Son is a 1959 Soviet history film directed by Vladimir Chebotaryov.

Plot 
The film tells about the famous Ossetian poet Kosta Khetagurov.

Cast 
 Vladimir Tkhapsaev as Konstantin Levanovich (Kosta) Khetagurov
 Lia Eliava as Anna Aleksandrovna Tsalikova
 Nina Alisova as Varvara Grigoryevna Shreders
  as General Kokhanov
 Pavel Kadochnikov as Dzhambul Dzakhsorov
 Vladimir Kosarev as Vasiliy Dobrokhotov
 Anatoli Abramov	
 Georgi Chernovolenko

References

External links 
 

1959 films
1950s Russian-language films
Soviet drama films
1959 drama films